NEO Surveyor, formerly called Near-Earth Object Camera (NEOCam), then NEO Surveillance Mission, is a planned space-based infrared telescope designed to survey the Solar System for potentially hazardous asteroids.

The NEO Surveyor spacecraft will survey from the Sun–Earth L1 (inner) Lagrange point, allowing it to see objects inside Earth's orbit, and its mid-infrared detectors sensitive to thermal emission will detect asteroids independently of their illumination by the Sun. The NEO Surveyor mission will be a successor to the NEOWISE mission, and the two missions have the same principal investigator, Amy Mainzer at the University of Arizona.

Since first proposed in 2006, the concept repeatedly competed unsuccessfully for NASA funding against science missions unrelated to planetary defense, despite an unfunded 2005 US Congressional directive to NASA. In 2019, the Planetary Defense Coordination Office decided to fund this mission outside NASA's science budget due to its national security implications. On 11 June 2021, NASA authorized the NEO Surveyor mission to proceed to the preliminary design phase. The Jet Propulsion Laboratory will lead development of the mission.

As of December 2022, NEO Surveyor is expected to be launched no later than June 2028.

History 
NASA did not prioritize this mandate, and directed the NEOCam project to compete against science missions for general funds unrelated to planetary defense and disaster mitigation planning.

Proposals for NEOCam were submitted to NASA's Discovery Program in 2006, 2010, 2015, 2016 and 2017, but each time were not selected for launch. The mission concept nonetheless received technology development funding in 2010 to design and test new infrared detectors optimized for asteroid and comet detection and sizing. The project received additional funding for further technological development in September 2015 (US$3 million), and in January 2017.

Following calls to fully fund the mission outside NASA's Planetary Science Division or directly from Congress itself, NASA’s associate administrator for science announced on 23 September 2019 that instead of competing for funding, NEOCam will be implemented under the name NEO Surveillance Mission with budget from NASA's Planetary Defense Coordination Office, within the Planetary Science Division. The near-miss of asteroid 2019 OK, which slipped past extant detection methods in July 2019, has been suggested to have helped prompt this decision.

For funding and management purposes, the NEO Surveillance Mission is officially a new project, but it is the same space telescope, the same team, and the mission's goals remain unchanged.

Objectives 
Secondary science goals include detection and characterization of approximately one million asteroids in the asteroid belt and thousands of comets, as well as identification of potential NEO targets for human and robotic exploration.

The Jet Propulsion Laboratory (JPL) will lead development of the mission. The total cost of the mission is estimated to be between US$500 million and US$600 million.

Spacecraft 
The mission should reach the 90% congressional goal within 10 years, with an anticipated mission lifetime of 12 years.

Telescope and camera 
Asteroids are dark, with albedos of at most 30% and as low as 5%. An optical telescope looks for the light they reflect and can therefore only see them when looking away from the Sun at the sunlit side of the asteroids, and not when looking towards the sun at the unlit backside of the object. In addition, opposition surge makes asteroids even brighter when the Earth is close to the axis of sunlight. The combined effect is equivalent to the comparison of a Full moon at night to a New Moon in daytime, and the light of the Sun-lit asteroids has been called "full asteroid" similar to a "full moon".  
Evidencing this bias, over half (53%) of the known Near Earth objects were discovered in just 3.8% of the sky, in a 22.5° cone facing directly away from the Sun, and the vast majority (87%) were first found in only 15% of the sky, in the 45° cone facing away from the Sun. 
A telescope operating at thermal infrared wavelengths instead detects their surfaces that have been warmed by the Sun and is almost equally sensitive to their lit and unlit sides, but needs to operate in space to achieve good sensitivity over a wide field of view.

The NEO Surveillance Mission will employ a  infrared telescope operating wide-field cameras at two thermal infrared wavelength channels for a total wavelength range between 4 µm and 10 µm. Its field of view is 11.56 square degrees. It will use a modified version of the HgCdTe Astronomical Wide Area Infrared Imager (HAWAII) mercury–cadmium–telluride detector developed by Teledyne Imaging Sensors. The mission prototype detector was successfully tested in April 2013. The detector array is 2,048 × 2,048 pixels and will produce 82 gigabits of data per day. For good infrared performance without the use of cryogenic fluid refrigeration, the detector will be passively cooled to  using techniques proven by the Spitzer Space Telescope. Unlike its predecessor NEOWISE, it will therefore not suffer from a performance degradation due to running out of coolant (its mission duration will however still be limited, as the orbital station keeping needed to maintain its position at SEL1 uses propellant).

Operations 
The NEO Surveyor spacecraft will operate in a halo orbit around the Sun–Earth L1, and employ a sunshade. This orbit will allow fast data downlink speeds to Earth, allowing full-frame images to be downloaded from the telescope.

Images

See also 
 Asteroid impact prediction
 Asteroid impact avoidance
 List of largest infrared telescopes
 List of near-Earth object observation projects
 Wide-field Infrared Survey Explorer (WISE & NEOWISE)
 List of proposed space observatories

NEOs search projects
 B612 Foundation, an organization that studied NEOs and proposed a similar mission
 Sentinel Space Telescope, B612's failed space telescope proposal similar to NEOSM
 Near Earth Object Surveillance Satellite, a Canadian small satellite intended to detect NEOs
 The Spaceguard Foundation, an organization that attempts to locate NEOs
 Whipple (spacecraft), a proposed space telescope in the Discovery program
 Asteroid Terrestrial-impact Last Alert System, a ground-based NEO detection system funded by NASA since the end of 2015

References

External links 
 NEOCam website by Caltech

NASA space probes
Infrared telescopes
Space telescopes
Astronomical surveys
Asteroid surveys
Near-Earth object tracking
Jet Propulsion Laboratory
Discovery program proposals
2028 in spaceflight